Walter McGehee Hooper (March 27, 1931December 7, 2020) was an American writer and literary advisor of the estate of C.S. Lewis. He was a literary trustee for Owen Barfield from December 1997 to October 2006.

Life
Hooper was born in Reidsville, North Carolina, United States. He earned an M.A. in education in 1958 from the University of North Carolina<ref>Crockford's Clerical Directory’’, 1973-74, 85th Edition, p 457.</ref> and was an instructor in English at the University of Kentucky in the early 1960s. He served briefly in 1963 as C.S. Lewis's private secretary when Lewis was in declining health. He devoted himself to Lewis's memory after his death in November 1963, eventually taking up residence in Oxford, England, where he lived until his death.

Hooper became a C.S. Lewis papers custodian, advocate, and editor of his works. The Lewis papers, as researched by Hooper, contain primary data on the friendship between Lewis and his fellow Oxford don J.R.R. Tolkien.

Hooper also studied for the Anglican ministry at St Stephen's House, Oxford and was ordained deacon in 1964 and priest in 1965. He was Chaplain of Wadham College, Oxford 1965-67 and Assistant Chaplain of Jesus College, Oxford 1967-70. He converted to the Catholic Church in 1988, and was a daily communicant at the Oxford Oratory. He described meeting Pope John Paul II in 1984, when still an Anglican, as "When the pope walked into the room it was as if Aslan himself had arrived."

Aged 89, Hooper died from complications of COVID-19 on 7 December 2020 during the COVID-19 pandemic in England.

Literary work
Hooper's works include: 
 C.S. Lewis: A Biography (co-authored with Roger Lancelyn Green) (1974)
 Study guide to The Screwtape Letters with Owen Barfield (1976)
 Past Watchful Dragons: The Narnian Chronicles of C.S. Lewis (1979)
 With Anthony Marchington Through Joy and Beyond: The Life of C.S. Lewis (1979)
 The Chronicles of Narnia Soundbook (TLWW, TVOTDT, PC, TSC) (abridged) with program booklet by Walter Hooper (1980)
 Through Joy and Beyond: A Pictorial Biography of C.S. Lewis (1982)
 C.S. Lewis: A Companion and Guide (1996)
 C.S. Lewis: A Complete Guide to His Life and Works (1998)

In addition, Hooper edited or wrote introductions for approximately 30 books of Lewisian manuscripts and scholarship. Several of these books contain previously unknown or little-known works by Lewis.

The following works were edited by Hooper: 
 All My Road Before Me: The Diary of C.S. Lewis, 1922–27. San Diego: Harcourt, 1991.
 Boxen: The Imaginary World of the Young C.S. Lewis. New York: Harcourt, 1985.
 Christian Reflections. Grand Rapids: Eerdmans, 1967.
 C.S. Lewis: Collected Letters, Volume 1: Family Letters (1905–1931). London: HarperCollins, 2000.
 C.S. Lewis: Collected Letters, Volume 2: Books, Broadcasts and War (1931–1949). London: HarperCollins, 2004.
 C.S. Lewis: Collected Letters, Volume 3: Narnia, Cambridge and Joy (1950–1963). London: HarperCollins, 2006.
 C.S. Lewis: Readings for Meditation and Reflection. San Francisco: Harper, 1992.
 God in the Dock: Essays on Theology and Ethics. Grand Rapids: Eerdmans, 1970.
 Image and Imagination. Cambridge: Cambridge University Press, 2013.
 Narrative Poems. Edited with preface by Walter Hooper. New York: Harcourt Brace Jovanovich, 1969.
 Of Other Worlds: Essays and Stories. Edited with preface by Walter Hooper. New York: Harcourt, Brace & World, 1966.
 Of This & Other Worlds. Edited with preface by Walter Hooper. London: Collins, 1982.
 On Stories, and Other Essays on Literature. Edited with preface by Walter Hooper. New York: Harcourt Brace Jovanovich, 1982.
 Poems. New York: Harcourt Brace Jovanovich, 1964.
 Present Concerns. San Diego: Harcourt Brace Jovanovich, 1986.
 Selected Literary Essays. London: Cambridge University Press, 1969.
 Spirits in Bondage: A Cycle of Lyrics. Edited with a preface by Walter Hooper. New York: Harcourt Brace Jovanovich, 1984.
 Studies in Medieval and Renaissance Literature. Collected by Walter Hooper. New York: Harcourt, Brace & World, 1966.
 The Business of Heaven: Daily Readings from C.S. Lewis. San Diego: Harcourt, 1984.
 The Collected Poems of C.S. Lewis. London: Fount, 1994.
 The Dark Tower & Other Stories. New York: Harcourt Brace Jovanovich, 1977.
 The Weight of Glory and Other Addresses (revised and expanded). Edited with introduction by Walter Hooper. New York: Macmillan, 1980.
 They Stand Together: The Letters of C.S. Lewis to Arthur Greeves (1914–1963). New York: Macmillan, 1979.
 Letters of C.S. Lewis. Edited with a memoir by W.H. Lewis. Revised and enlarged by Walter Hooper. New York: Harcourt Brace, 1988.

Honors
In 1972 Hooper was awarded the second annual Mythopoeic Scholarship Award in Inklings Studies, for scholarly contribution to the criticism and appreciation of the epic fantasy literature generated by the Inklings School, by the Mythopoeic Society.

Controversy
In 1977, Hooper published the unfinished science fiction novel The Dark Tower, a previously unknown work by C.S. Lewis. The novel resembles Lewis's known works in some ways and departs from them in others. A school of critics headed by Kathryn Lindskoog accused Hooper of either forging the work in toto or adding a lot of padding onto small fragments of an unknown work by Lewis to create the published work. Lindskoog also questioned the authenticity of other posthumously published works edited by Hooper.

Hooper rejected these accusations, and independent research exists to disprove them and confirm the authenticity of the posthumous Lewis works edited by Hooper. Professor Alastair Fowler of the University of Edinburgh had Lewis as his doctoral supervisor in 1952, and he recalls discussing The Dark Tower with his mentor. This is a firsthand account of the manuscript's existence during Lewis' lifetime.Harry Lee Poe, "Shedding Light on the Dark Tower," Christianity Today, February 2, 2007 Lewis' stepson Douglas Gresham also disagrees with Lindskoog's forgery claims. "The whole controversy thing was engineered for very personal reasons…. Her fanciful theories have been pretty thoroughly discredited."

 Related works 
 Diana Pavlac Glyer The Company They Keep: C. S. Lewis and J. R. R. Tolkien as Writers in Community''. Kent State University Press. Kent Ohio. 2007.

References

External links
 "Walter Hooper Papers, circa 1940-1980", finding aid at the University of North Carolina
 "Walter Hooper", citation at the Wade Center, Wheaton College (Clyde S. Kilby Lifetime Achievement Award, 2009)
 
 

 

1931 births
2020 deaths
American male biographers
American expatriates in the United Kingdom
Converts to Roman Catholicism from Anglicanism
People from Reidsville, North Carolina
University of Kentucky alumni
20th-century American biographers
People from Oxford
Alumni of St Stephen's House, Oxford
Catholics from North Carolina
Writers from North Carolina
Deaths from the COVID-19 pandemic in England